The Rural Municipality of Elcapo No. 154 is a rural municipality (RM) in the Canadian province of Saskatchewan within Census Division No. 5 and  Division No. 1. It is located in the southeast portion of the province.

History 
The RM of Elcapo No. 154 incorporated as a rural municipality on December 12, 1910.

Geography 
The bigmouth buffalo (Ictiobus cyprinellus) is a species of special concern to environmentalists in this area.

Communities and localities 
The following urban municipalities are surrounded by the RM.

Towns
Grenfell
Broadview

The following unincorporated communities are within the RM.

Localities
Oakshela

Demographics 

Government 
The RM of Elcapo No. 154 is governed by an elected municipal council and an appointed administrator that meets on the second Monday of every month. The reeve of the RM is Larry Parrott while its administrator is Mervin Schmidt. The RM's office is located in Broadview.

References 

E

Division No. 5, Saskatchewan